Robert Templeton (1894 – 1967) was a Scottish football player and manager. He played primarily as a defender for Hibernian from 1911 until 1925, playing on the losing side in the 1914 Scottish Cup Final but not featuring in the consecutive defeats of 1923 and 1924. He then managed the club from 1925 to 1936, occasionally filling in as a player in the first few seasons (including as goalkeeper) and eventually taking charge of over 400 matches – the Hibees were relegated from the top division in 1930–31 but returned as winners of the lower tier in 1932–33. He was born and died in Paisley.

See also
 List of one-club men in association football 
 List of outfield association footballers who played in goal

References

Bobby Templeton, www.ihibs.co.uk

1894 births
1967 deaths
Date of birth missing
Date of death missing
Footballers from Paisley, Renfrewshire
Association football fullbacks
Scottish footballers
Outfield association footballers who played in goal
Hibernian F.C. players
Scottish football managers
Hibernian F.C. managers
Scottish Football League managers
Scottish Football League players
Neilston Victoria F.C. players